Noise figure (NF) and noise factor (F) are figures of merit that indicate degradation of the signal-to-noise ratio (SNR) that is caused by components in a signal chain. These figures of merit are used to evaluate the performance of an amplifier or a radio receiver, with lower values indicating better performance.

The noise factor is defined as the ratio of the output noise power of a device to the portion thereof attributable to thermal noise in the input termination at standard noise temperature T0 (usually 290 K). The noise factor is thus the ratio of actual output noise to that which would remain if the device itself did not introduce noise, or the ratio of input SNR to output SNR.

The noise factor and noise figure are related, with the former being a unitless ratio and the latter being the same ratio but expressed in units of decibels (dB).

General 
The noise figure is the difference in decibels (dB) between the noise output of the actual receiver to the noise output of an “ideal” receiver with the same overall gain and bandwidth when the receivers are connected to matched sources at the standard noise temperature T0 (usually 290 K). The noise power from a simple load is equal to kTB, where k is the Boltzmann constant, T is the absolute temperature of the load (for example a resistor), and B is the measurement bandwidth.

This makes the noise figure a useful figure of merit for terrestrial systems, where the antenna effective temperature is usually near the standard 290 K.  In this case, one receiver with a noise figure, say 2 dB better than another, will have an output signal to noise ratio that is about 2 dB better than the other. However, in the case of satellite communications systems, where the receiver antenna is pointed out into cold space, the antenna effective temperature is often colder than 290 K. In these cases a 2 dB improvement in receiver noise figure will result in more than a 2 dB improvement in the output signal to noise ratio. For this reason, the related figure of effective noise temperature is therefore often used instead of the noise figure for characterizing satellite-communication receivers and low-noise amplifiers.

In heterodyne systems, output noise power includes spurious contributions from image-frequency transformation, but the portion attributable to thermal noise in the input termination at standard noise temperature includes only that which appears in the output via the principal frequency transformation of the system and excludes that which appears via the image frequency transformation.

Definition 
The noise factor  of a system is defined as

The  quantities are unitless power ratios. 
The noise figure  is defined as the noise factor in units of decibels (dB):

These formulae are only valid when the input termination is at standard noise temperature , although in practice small differences in temperature do not significantly affect the values.

The noise factor of a device is related to its noise temperature :

Attenuators have a noise factor  equal to their attenuation ratio  when their physical temperature equals .

Noise factor of cascaded devices 

If several devices are cascaded, the total noise factor can be found with Friis' formula:

The first amplifier in a chain usually has the most significant effect on the total noise figure because the noise figures of the following stages are reduced by stage gains. Consequently, the first amplifier usually has a low noise figure, and the noise figure requirements of subsequent stages is usually more relaxed.

Noise factor as a function of additional noise

The noise factor may be expressed as a function of the additional output referred noise power  and the power gain  of an amplifier.

Derivation
From the definition of noise factor

and assuming a system which has a noisy single stage amplifier. The signal to noise ratio of this amplifier would include its own output referred noise , the amplified signal  and the amplified input noise ,

Substituting the output SNR to the noise factor definition,

In cascaded systems  does not refer to the output noise of the previous component. An input termination at the standard noise temperature is still assumed for the individual component. This means that the additional noise power added by each component is independent of the other components.

Optical noise figure
The above describes noise in electrical systems. However, there is also noise in optical systems. In these, the sources have no fundamental noise.

In the 1990s, an optical noise figure has been defined. This has been called   for photon number fluctuations. The powers needed for SNR and noise factor calculation are the electrical powers caused by the current in a photodiode. SNR is the square of mean photocurrent divided by variance of photocurrent. Monochromatic or sufficiently attenuated light has a Poisson distribution of detected photons. If, during a detection interval the expectation value of detected photons is  then the variance is also  and one obtains  =  = . Behind an optical amplifier with power gain  there will be a mean of  photons. In the limit of large  the variance of photons is  where  is the spontaneous emission factor. One obtains  =  = . Resulting optical noise factor is  =  = .

 is in conceptual conflict compared to the electrical noise factor, which is now called :

Photocurrent is proportional to optical power. Optical power is proportional to squares of a field amplitude (electric or magnetic). So, the receiver is nonlinear in amplitude. The power needed for  calculation is proportional to the 4th power of the signal amplitude.

At a certain electrical frequency, noise occurs in phase (I) and in quadrature (Q) with the signal. Both these quadratures are available behind the electrical amplifier. The same holds in an optical amplifier. But the direct detection photoreceiver needed for measurement of  takes mainly the in-phase noise into account whereas quadrature noise can be neglected for high. Also, the receiver outputs only one quadrature. So, one quadrature is lost. 

For an optical amplifier with large  it holds  ≥ 2 whereas for an electrical amplifier it holds  ≥ 1.

Moreover, today's long-haul optical fiber communication is dominated by coherent optical I&Q receivers but  does not describe the SNR degradation observed in these.

The above conflicts are resolved by the optical in-phase and quadrature noise figure . It can be measured using a coherent optical I&Q receiver. In these, power of the output signal is proportional to the square of an optical field amplitude because they are linear in amplitude. They pass both quadratures. For an optical amplifier it holds  =  ≥ 1. Quantity  is the input-referred number of added noise photons per mode. 

 and  can easily be converted into each other.

Unified noise figure
Total noise power spectral density per mode is  + . In the electrical domain  can be neglected. In the optical domain  can be neglected. In between, say, in the low THz or thermal domain, both will need to be considered. It is possible to blend between electrical and optical domains such that a universal noise figure is obtained. 

This has been attempted by a noise figure  where the subscript stands for fluctuations of amplitude squares. At optical frequencies  equals  and involves detection of only 1 quadrature. But the conceptual difference to  cannot be overcome: It seems impossible that for increasing frequency (from electrical to thermal to optical) 2 quadratures (in the electrical domain) gradually become 1 quadrature (in optical receivers which determine  or ). The ideal noise factor would need to go from 1 (electrical) to 2 (optical), which is not intuitive.

There are no contradictions because both these are in conceptual match (powers proportional to squares of amplitudes, linear, 2 quadratures, ideal noise factor equal to 1). Thermal noise  and fundamental quantum noise  are taken into account. The unified noise figure is  =  = .

See also 

 Noise
 Noise (electronic)
 Noise figure meter
 Noise level 
 Thermal noise
 Signal-to-noise ratio
 Y-factor

References

External links
 Noise Figure Calculator 2- to 30-Stage Cascade
 Noise Figure and Y Factor Method Basics and Tutorial
 Mobile phone noise figure

Noise (electronics)
Radar signal processing
Acoustics
Sound